It Couldn't Have Happened – But It Did is a 1936 American romantic crime film directed by Phil Rosen. The film is also known as It Couldn't Have Happened (American review title).

Cast 
Reginald Denny as Greg Stone
Evelyn Brent as Beverly Drake
Jack La Rue as Smiley Clark
Inez Courtney as Linda Sands
Hugh Marlowe as Edward Forrest
Claude King as Ellis Holden
Bryant Washburn as Norman Carter
Robert Homans as Police Lt. O'Neill
Crauford Kent as Bob Bennett
Robert Frazer as Lloyd Schaefer – Stage Manager
Miki Morita as Hashi – Houseboy
Emily LaRue as Ingenue

Plot 
Theatrical Writer Greg Stone (Reginald Denny) is rehearsing with his troupe. Some secrets between the actors. And some problems with contracts to be signed with the producers. Then two murders. Stone is forced into investigating ...

External links 

1936 crime films
1936 films
1936 romance films
American black-and-white films
American crime films
American romance films
Chesterfield Pictures films
Films directed by Phil Rosen
Romantic crime films
1930s English-language films
1930s American films